Chrystos (born November 7, 1946, as Christina Smith) is a writer and activist who has published various books and poems that explore indigenous Americans's civil rights, social justice, and feminism. They identify as Menominee and two-spirit, but are not enrolled in any tribe. Chrystos is also a lecturer, writing teacher and fine-artist. The poet uses the pronouns "they" and "them".

Life and career
Chrystos – a resident of Ocean Shores, Washington since 2011 – is a lesbian- and two-spirit-identifying writer, artist and activist. Born off-reservation in San Francisco, California, self-identifying as an urban Indian, Chrystos was taught to read by a self-educated father, and began writing poetry at age nine. Chrystos has written of a difficult, "emotional and abnormal" childhood, including sexual abuse by a relative, life with an abusive and depressed white mother of Lithuanian and Alsatian descent, and a Menominee father who was a WW2 veteran. At the age of seventeen, Chrystos was placed into a mental institution. They fell into drug addiction, alcoholism, and prostitution during this time. They would be re-institutionalized several more times before deciding it was ineffective in helping their mental health issues.

A self-described political poet, Chrystos was inspired by familial angst stemming from European American cultural hegemony, and more positively influenced by the work of Audre Lorde, Joy Harjo, Elizabeth Woody, and Lillian Pitt, among others, to produce a series of volumes of poetry and prose throughout the 1980s and 1990s . Chrystos' work focuses on social justice issues, such as how colonialism, genocide, class and gender affect the lives of women and Indigenous peoples. Much of the writer's childhood is evident in works about street life, gardening, mental institutions, incest, "the Man" (authoritarian patriarchy), love, sex, and hate. The works are primarily intended for an audience of Native American / First Nations, people of color more broadly, and lesbians. The works are also aimed at raising awareness of Native American heritage and culture, while breaking down stereotypes. Chrystos self-illustrated many of the covers, and usually had the books published in Canada to work around censorious American publishers and "very little support for writers" in the United States.

While they are better known for their poems about social justice, Chrystos also has a significant body of erotic poetry. This work has been called "delicious reading"  and adopts a celebratory tone, in contrast to the darker themes in their other work. They co-edited 
Best Lesbian Erotica 1999 with Tristan Taormino.

Chrystos' awards and honors include a National Endowment for the Arts grant, the Human Rights Freedom of Expression Award, the Sappho Award of Distinction from the Astrea Lesbian Foundation for Justice, a Barbara Deming Grant, and the Audre Lorde International Poetry Competition.

Chrystos' activism has focused on efforts to free Norma Jean Croy and Leonard Peltier, and the rights of tribes such as  the Diné (Navajo) and Mohawk people. In a 2010 interview with Black Coffee Poet, Chrystos described their social justice interests as "diverse," citing abortion, wife-battering, and prisoner issues, although they acknowledge these issues are of "no immediate benefit" to them.

Bibliography
This Bridge Called My Back (anthology) Kitchen Table: Women of Color Press, 1981; contributor
Not Vanishing, Vancouver: Press Gang Publishers, 1988, 
Dream On, Vancouver: Press Gang Publishers, 1991
In Her I Am, Vancouver: Press Gang Publishers, 1993
Fugitive Colors, Cleveland: Cleveland State University Poetry Center, 1995, 
Fire Power,  Vancouver: Press Gang Publishers, 1995, 
Some Poems by People I Like (anthology of 5 poets; Sandra Alland, editor) Toronto: SandrasLittleBookshop, 2007, ; contributor
Best Lesbian Erotica 1999, Cleis Press, 1999, ; co-editor

See also

 Native American studies
 Lesbian poetry

References

Bealy, Joanne. "An Interview with Chrystos"; Off Our Backs, Vol. 33, September 2003, p. 11
E. Centime Zeleke. "Speaking about Language". Canadian Woman Studies, Vol. 16, No. 2, 1996, pp. 33–35.
Retter, Yolanda. "Chrystos". Encyclopedia of Lesbian, Gay, Bisexual and Transgendered History in America, Vol. 1. Edited by Marc Stein. Detroit: Scribner's; 2004, pp. 214–215,
 "Chrystos", biographical entry at the Voices in the Gaps database of the University of Minnesota; 2009. (PDF download from the target page.)

External links 

1946 births
Living people
American lesbian writers
American people who self-identify as being of Native American descent
American prostitutes
Writers from San Francisco
Writers from Bainbridge Island, Washington
American LGBT poets
LGBT people from Washington (state)
American women poets
20th-century American poets
20th-century American women writers
Non-binary activists
21st-century American LGBT people
American non-binary writers